Lovely Music (full name: Lovely Music Ltd.) is an American record label devoted to new American music.  Based in New York City, the label was founded in 1978 by Mimi Johnson, an outgrowth of her nonprofit production company Performing Artservices Inc. It is one of the most important and longest running labels focusing exclusively on new music and has released over 100 recordings on LP, CD, and videocassette.

Composers represented on the label include Johnson's husband Robert Ashley (most of whose major works are in its catalog), as well as David Behrman, Alvin Lucier, Paul Dresher, William Duckworth, Jon Hassell, Joan La Barbara,  David Tudor, Peter Gordon, and Meredith Monk, among others.

Catalog
 1001 (1978) Robert Ashley - Private Parts
 1002 (1979) Robert Ashley - Automatic Writing
 1003 (1990) Robert Ashley - Yellow Man With Heart With Wings
 1004 (1994) Robert Ashley - eL/Aficianado
 1005 (1998) Robert Ashley - Your Money My Life Goodbye
 1006 (2000) Robert Ashley - Dust
 1007 (2005) Robert Ashley - Celestial Excursions
 1008 (2006) Robert Ashley - Foreign Experiences
 1009 (2007) Robert Ashley - Now Eleanor's Idea
 1010 (2008) Robert Ashley - Concrete
 1011 (1980) Alvin Lucier - Music on a Long Thin Wire
 1012 (1981) Alvin Lucier - Panorama
 1013 (1981) Alvin Lucier - I Am Sitting In A Room
 1014 (1982) Alvin Lucier - Music for Solo Performer
 1015 (1983) Alvin Lucier - Still and Moving Lines of Silence in Families of Hyperbolas, 1-4
 1016 (1985) Alvin Lucier - Still and Moving Lines of Silence in Families of Hyperbolas, 5-8
 1017 (1988) Alvin Lucier - Sferics
 1018 (1990) Alvin Lucier - Crossings (Three Works for Classical Instruments and Oscillators)
 1019 (1994) Alvin Lucier - Clocker
 1021 (1990) Jon Hassell - Vernal Equinox
 1031 (1978) Peter Gordon -  Star Jaws
 1041 (1977) David Behrman - On the Other Ocean
 1042 (1978) David Behrman - Leapday Night
 1051 (1977) Meredith Monk - Key
 1061 (1978) “Blue Gene Tyranny - “Out of the Blue”
 1062 (1979) "Blue" Gene Tyranny - Just For The Record
 1063 (1982) "Blue" Gene Tyranny - The Intermediary
 1064 (1990) "Blue" Gene Tyranny - Free Delivery
 1065 (1994) "Blue" Gene Tyranny - Country Boy Country Dog
 1066 (2003) "Blue" Gene Tyranny - Take Your Time
 1081 (1979) Tom Johnson - An Hour For Piano
 1091 (1979) Gordon Mumma - Dresden / Venezia / Megaton
 1092 (1986) Gordon Mumma with Pauline Oliveros and David Tudor - Mesa / Pontpoint / Fwyyn
 1093 (2000) Gordon Mumma - Studio Retrospect
 1601 (1984) David Tudor - Pulsers / Untitled (aka Three Works for Live Electronics)
 1602 (1995) David Tudor - Neural Synthesis Nos. 6-9
 1801 (1982) Roger Reynolds - Voicespace I, III and IV
 1901 (1982) Pauline Oliveros - Accordion & Voice
 1902 (1984) Pauline Oliveros - The Wanderer
 1903 (1990) Pauline Oliveros - Crone Music
 2001 (1983) Éliane Radigue - Songs of Milarepa
 2003 (1987) Éliane Radigue - Jetsun Mila
 2011 (1996) Paul Dresher - This Same Temple
 2021 (1987) Roscoe Mitchell - Four Compositions
 2022 (1993) Roscoe Mitchell - Pilgrimage
 2031 (1983) William Duckworth - The Time Curve Preludes
 2032 (1987) William Duckworth - Thirty-One Days
 2033 (1994) William Duckworth - Southern Harmony
 2053 (1998) John Cage - Music of Changes
 2061 (1986) Maggi Payne - Crystal
 2071 (1990) Takehisa Kosugi - Violin Improvisations
 2081 (1989) Annea Lockwood - A Sound Map of the Hudson River
 2082 (1999) Annea Lockwood - Breaking the Surface
 2083 (2008) Annea Lockwood - A Sound Map of the Danube
 2091 (1991) Fast Forward - Panhandling
 3001 (1991) Joan La Barbara - Sound Paintings
 3002 (1994) Joan La Barbara - 73 Poems
 3003 (2003) Joan La Barbara - Voice Is the Original Instrument
 3011 (1991) Paul DeMarinis - Music As A Second Language
 3021 (1991) Thomas Buckner - Full Spectrum Voice
 3022 (1994) Thomas Buckner - Sign of the Times
 3023 (1998) Thomas Buckner - Inner Journey
 3024 (2000) Thomas Buckner - His Tone of Voice
 3031 (1992) Barbara Held - Upper Air Observation
 3041 (1993) Yasunao Tone - Musica Iconologos
 3051 (1994) Lois Svard - With and Without Memory
 3052 (1997) Lois Svard - Other Places
 3061 (1998) Leroy Jenkins - Solo
 3071 (1995) David Rosenboom - Two Lines
 3081 (2002) DownTown Ensemble - DownTown Only
 3091 (2001) Chris Mann - and the use
 3301 (1997) Robert Ashley - Atalanta (Acts of God)
 3303 (1997) Robert Ashley - Atalanta (Acts of God) Vol.II
 4001 (2004) Jacqueline Humbert - Chanteuse
 4917 (1991) Robert Ashley - Perfect Lives
 4921 (2002) Robert Ashley - In Sara, Mencken, Christ and Beethoven There Were Men and Women
 5001 (2016) Robert Ashley - Crash
 5002 (1992) Robert Ashley - Improvement (Don Leaves Linda)
 5011 (1999) Alvin Lucier - Theme
 5012 (2001) Alvin Lucier - Still Lives
 5013 (2009) Alvin Lucier - Music for Solo Performer & Sferics

See also
 List of record labels

References

External links
Lovely Music Ltd. official site

American record labels
Record labels established in 1978
Classical music record labels
Companies based in New York City